The 1977 1. divisjon was the 33rd completed season of top division football in Norway.

Overview
There were 12 teams in the division. Lillestrøm SK emerged as the championship victors, their third league title. Lillestrøm's 36 points was at the time a record for most points in a season, two more than Viking and Fredrikstad achieved in the 1972 season.

Teams and locations
''Note: Table lists in alphabetical order.

League table

Results

Season statistics

Top scorer
 Trygve Johannessen, Viking – 17 goals

Attendances

References
Norway - List of final tables (RSSSF)
Norsk internasjonal fotballstatistikk (NIFS)

Eliteserien seasons
Norway
Norway
1